John Church (17 September 1919 in Lowestoft, Norfolk, England - 10 September 2004), is an English retired footballer who played as a left winger in the Football League.

References

External links

1919 births
2004 deaths
English footballers
People from Lowestoft
Association football midfielders
Lowestoft Town F.C. players
Norwich City F.C. players
Colchester United F.C. players
Braintree Town F.C. players
English Football League players